Build to rent (BTR) refers to the emerging sub-market in private rented residential stock, designed specifically for renting rather than for sale, typically owned by institutional investors and managed by specialist operators.

Growth in the UK market 

In October 2016, it was estimated that only some 8,000 units had been built with a further 15,000 units under construction. To date, the majority of completed projects have come forward in London and the major provincial cities such as Manchester, Liverpool and Sheffield. Construction is now underway in Birmingham and Leeds. The UK Government is reportedly encouraging the sector's growth.

By September 2019 the number of units either built or in construction was reported to have increased to 35,000 following large developments by a number of firms report in the media.

Build-to-rent is the most contemporary development in the private rented sector (PRS) and offers housing across the full spectrum of privately rented accommodation in terms of scale and service offering, often with affordable housing being integrated through discounted market rental homes.

Criticism 
Tenants in BTR properties typically pay an 11% premium over other properties in similar locations, according to one study.

United States 
Haven Realty is a national leader with a portfolio of 35 build-to-rent communities valued at more than $1.2 billion .

See also 
 Buy to let

References 

Housing